"Broadway Limited" is the third episode of the first season of the HBO television series Boardwalk Empire, which premiered October 3, 2010. It was written by supervising producer Margaret Nagle and was directed by executive producer Tim Van Patten.

Nucky makes a deal with black gangster Chalky White to handle the repackaging and distribution of bootlegged whiskey. Margaret is given a job at a boutique through Nucky's connections. Van Alden learns that Jimmy was involved in the shooting in the woods.

Main cast 
 Steve Buscemi as Enoch "Nucky" Thompson
 Michael Pitt as James "Jimmy" Darmody
 Kelly Macdonald as Margaret Schroeder/Thompson
 Michael Shannon as Nelson Van Alden
 Shea Whigham as Elias "Eli" Thompson
 Aleksa Palladino as Angela Darmody
 Michael Stuhlbarg as Arnold Rothstein
 Vincent Piazza as Charles Luciano
 Paz de la Huerta as Lucy Danziger, Nucky's mistress
 Anthony Laciura as Edward Anselm "Eddie" Kessler, Nucky's assistant and butler.
 Paul Sparks as Mieczyslaw "Mickey Doyle" Kuzik, a bootlegger and former associate of Nucky's.
 Michael K. Williams as Albert "Chalky" White

Plot 
After being informed that the robbery survivor has been hospitalized, Nucky orders Eli to kill him before he can be questioned by federal agents. At a livery stable, Nucky finalizes a deal with Chalky White to dilute and bottle bootlegged whiskey for resale in exchange for 36% of profits. Eli attempts to smother the witness, but is interrupted by Van Alden, who uses a clever ruse to smuggle him out of the hospital. Nucky arranges for Margaret to be hired at a dress shop in Atlantic City's Ritz-Carlton hotel; the Frenchwoman who owns the shop is angered when Nucky makes her fire her experienced assistant. Nucky's mistress, Lucy Danzinger, visits the shop and takes every opportunity to insult Margaret while she assists her in trying on dresses.

Van Alden tries to transport the witness to New York but is soon forced to get him medical attention and strongarms a dentist into giving the man injections of cocaine to keep him alive. The witness reveals Jimmy's involvement in his shooting before dying of complications from the torture inflicted on him by Van Alden. Rothstein learns that the witness, a distant family member, has died, and sends Luciano to Atlantic City to find Jimmy and uncover the identity of his accomplice. Elsewhere, Jimmy learns of Angela's friendship with a local photographer and is forced to confront the reality that his decision to fight in the war cost him numerous opportunities to be a good father and provide for his family. Nucky informs Jimmy that with Van Alden on his trail, he can no longer risk his own interests by protecting him. Though Angela protests that he can't just leave them again, Jimmy packs his belongings and flees on a train headed westward to Chicago.

Mickey gets released from jail and meets with his financial backers, the D'Alessio brothers from Philadelphia; displeased with Mickey losing their investment in his liquor business, they demand that he repay their losses or suffer the consequences. Chalky discovers that his driver, a boy of just nineteen years of age, has been lynched. Nucky warns Chalky not to spark a race riot by seeking revenge and agrees to increase his take to 50% of profits in return for agreeing to let Eli cover up the boy's death as that of a jealous husband shooting him for sleeping with his wife. Van Alden is ordered to return home by his superiors at the Bureau while they determine whether he has the legal authority to continue his investigation. Nucky silently contemplates whether he might want to start a family.

Reception

Critical reception 
Phil Pirrello at IGN gave the episode a positive review with an 8/10 score. He said ""Limited" ends with Nucky forcing Jimmy out of town, and we're left surprised that this turn happens in episode three as opposed to at the end of the season. The first three episodes burn through a lot of story on the Nucky-Jimmy front, but that's okay - sending Jimmy to Chicago to play gangster with Capone is a good thing. It will complicate things for Nucky worse than Rothstein sic-ing Luciano on him. And more Nucky drama is never a bad thing." When talking about Shannon's character Van Alden he said "Shannon's Van Alden is one of the few characters who uses violence as a last resort, as he interrogates the suspect by putting his hand wrist-deep into the man's shotgun wound. As powerful and threatening as men like Nucky are, Van Alden emerges as a truly unique and dangerous threat; a pious federal agent who can use both the Bible and the law to justify his actions. Shannon excels in this scene, and in its follow-up: A quiet dinner at home with the wife that says very little but speaks so much about how complex and unpredictable Van Alden is." Joseph Oliveto at ScreenCrave also gave the episode 8/10 and said "Things are heating up: The previous two episodes of this show featured excellent performances but not much plot development. Luckily, we're picking up the pace now. Characters are facing actual threats, be it from the authorities, or competing criminals. Any good gangster drama needs a constant atmosphere of danger, and now we're getting one."

Ratings 
Ratings for the third episode were mostly stable. Ratings were down 0.1 with adults 18–49 to a 1.4 rating but once again having over 3.4 million viewers in its initial telecast.

References

External links 
 "Broadway Limited" at HBO
 

2010 American television episodes
Boardwalk Empire episodes
Television episodes directed by Tim Van Patten